The 2015–16 Florida Atlantic Owls men's basketball team represented Florida Atlantic University during the 2015–16 NCAA Division I men's basketball season. The Owls, led by second year head coach Michael Curry, played their home games at the FAU Arena, and were members of Conference USA. They finished the season 8–25, 5–13 in C-USA play to finish in a tie for 12th place. They defeated UTSA in the first round of the C-USA tournament to advance to the second round where they lost to Old Dominion.

Previous season 
The Owls finished the 2014–15 season 9–20, 2–16 in C-USA play to finish in last place. They failed to qualify for the C-USA tournament.

Departures

Incoming Transfers

Recruiting class of 2015

Recruiting class of 2016

Roster

Schedule

|-
!colspan=9 style=| Exhibition

|-
!colspan=9 style=| Non-conference regular season

|-
!colspan=12 style=| Conference USA regular season

|-
!colspan=9 style=| Conference USA tournament

|-

References

Florida Atlantic Owls men's basketball seasons
Florida Atlantic
Florida Atlantic Owls men's b
Florida Atlantic Owls men's b